Barbodes tumba is a species of cyprinid fish endemic to Mindanao, Philippines where it is found in Lake Lanao and associated water systems. This species can reach a length of  SL.

References

tumba
Freshwater fish of the Philippines
Endemic fauna of the Philippines
Fish described in 1924
Taxa named by Albert William Herre